The women's 1500 meter at the 2023 KNSB Dutch Single Distance Championships in Heerenveen took place at Thialf ice skating rink on Friday 3 February 2023. There were 20 participants. Antoinette Rijpma-de Jong, Marijke Groenewoud, and Jutta Leerdam qualified for the 2023 ISU World Speed Skating Championships in Heerenveen.

Statistics

Result

Referee: Loretta Staring.  Assistant: Miriam Kuipers.  Starter: Jans Rosing. 

Source:

Draw

References

Single Distance Championships
2023 Single Distance
World